Cnemaspis ingerorum is a species of diurnal gecko endemic to Sri Lanka.

References

 http://reptile-database.reptarium.cz/species?genus=Cnemaspis&species=ingerorum

ingerorum
Reptiles of Sri Lanka
Reptiles described in 2019